Henna Vänninen (born 17 September 1983 in Helsinki) is a Finnish actress. She is known for her role as Aamu Korhonen in the popular Finnish soap opera Salatut elämät.

Filmography 
 television series Zulu
 television series Salatut elämät – as Aamu Korhonen (2001–2004)
 Drama Ja ilta oli rauhaisa – as Galja (director Matti Salo) 1999
 Drama Hilman päivät, Seinäjoki summer theater (director Kari Mattila) 2003

References

External links

 

1983 births
Living people
Actresses from Helsinki